Psychedelia is an American documentary film from Hard Rain Films, that has been released in a revised and updated version in 2021. The film discusses the history of psychedelic drugs and their ability to produce mystical experiences. The therapeutic role of such drugs is considered, and controlled research studies conducted before the 1960s, at a time when such drugs were considered to be some of the most promising discoveries in the field of psychiatry, are discussed. Several study participant users are interviewed. The film was a winner for best documentary film at the New Jersey International Film Festival, and was an official selection at the Southern Utah International Documentary Film Festival (DOCUTAH) and the Orlando Film Festival.

Participants

The documentary film is narrated by Stephanie Willing, and includes the following participants (alphabetized by last name):

References

External links
  at the Hard Rains Films WebSite.
 

2015 films
2015 documentary films
American documentary films
2010s English-language films
2010s American films